Thomas Robinson was an English Renaissance composer and music teacher, who flourished around 1600. He taught and wrote music for lute, cittern, orpharion, bandora, viol, and voice.

Biography
Very little is known about Robinson's life, but it is possible to draw conclusions from the dedicatory pages of his works. He and his father were in service of the Cecil family: Robinson's father worked for the 1st Earl of Salisbury, Robert Cecil, and Robinson was in the service of the 1st Earl of Exeter, Thomas Cecil, who was Robert Cecil's brother. The Cecil family fostered several artists in these days, amongst others William Byrd and Orlando Gibbons.

It was before 1589 that Robinson became Princess Anne's (1574–1619) and Queen Sophie's (1557–1631) private music teacher at Elsinore, Denmark. Princess Anne was the daughter of the King of Denmark, Frederick II (1559–1588). It is presumed that Robinson must have been in his twenties then, so that his birth can be dated back to around 1560.

The Court of Denmark, like other courts, employed many well-recognized musicians from Denmark and other countries, like England, France, Germany and the Netherlands. It is known that John Dowland – the most famous Renaissance lutenist nowadays – worked as a court lutenist in Denmark from 1598 to 1606. Besides Robinson's own mention of his employment there, no official record of it exists.

In 1603, Robinson published his first book, Medulla Musicke, of which no copy survived. It was even suggested (Ward JM, see "Literature"), that it was never published at all, although Robinson seems to be referring to it in the first pages of his second book: "." From: "The Schoole of Musicke", 1603

Also in 1603, Robinson brought out his second book, The Schoole of Musicke, a tutor for lute and other instruments. It displaced John Alford's book A Briefe and Easye Instruction from 1574 (an English translation of Adrian Le Roy's Briefve et facile instruction pour apprendre la tabulature) as the most important lute tutor in England from then on.

In 1609 Robinson's third book, New Citharen Lessons, was published. It was a cittern tutor for beginners and advanced learners.

Robinson's works for the most part consist of his own compositions. But there are also arrangements of other pieces of music, some of which are still rather popular: for instance "My Lord Willoughby's Welcome Home" (in: The Schoole of Musicke) or "Can she excuse my wrongs?" (in New Citharen Lessons) – both originally composed by John Dowland.

There is no further information available about Robinson's life after 1609.

Works

Medulla Musicke
Medulla Musicke (The Stationer's Company, London, 1603) was a music tutor now presumably lost. It is supposed to have included 40 canons on the then popular plainsong Miserere after arrangements by William Byrd and Alfonso Ferrabosco.

The Schoole of Musicke
The Schoole of Musicke, (Tho. Este, London, 1603), was a tutor for lute, bandora, orpharion, viol, and singing.

Contents
 The Queenes good Night (for two lutes)
 Twenty waies upon the bels (for two lutes)
 Row well you Marriners
 A Galliard
 A Galliard
 A Plaine Song for 2 lutes (for two lutes)
 Grisse his delight
 Passamezzo Galliard (for two lutes)
 A Fantasie for 2 lutes (for two lutes)
 A Toy for 2 lutes (for two lutes)
 A Galliard
 Merry Melancholie
 Robinson's Riddle
 Goe from my Window
 A Toy
 A Gigue
 An Almaigne
 An Almaigne
 A Toy
 A Toy
 Robin is to the greenwood gone
 A Toy
 The Queenes Gigue
 Ut re mi fa so la: 9 sundry ways
 My Lord Willobies Welcome Home
 Bell Vedere
 The Spanish Pavin
 A Gigue
 A Gigue
 Walking in a country town
 Bony sweet boy
 A Gigue
 Lantero
 Three parts in one upon a[n old]ground
 Sweet Jesu who shall lend me wings
 A Psalme
 O Lord of whom I do depend
 O Lord thou art my righteousness

Furthermore, The Schoole of Musicke contains eight short pieces, seven of them called "A Psalme" in the chapter "Rules to instruct you to sing".

New Citharen Lessons
New Citharen Lessons, (London, 1609), was a cittern tutor for beginners and advanced learners. It included 53 compositions, the first 47 for four-course cittern (tuned e' d' g b), pieces 48 to 53 for fourteen-course cittern (tuned e' d' g bb f d G F E D C BBb AA GG).

Contents
 My Lord Treasurer his Paven
 The Galliard to the Pavin before
 A Fantasie
 Wades Welfare
 Powles Carranta
 O Cupid looke about thee
 For two Citherens in the unison (A Jigge for two Citherens)
 A Ground
 Pipers Galiard
 A Psalme
 Philips Pavin
 A Galiard
 A Galiard: Can she excuse my wrongs
 A Galiard
 A Psalme
 Passamezzo Paven
 Oft I have forsworne her company
 Galliard to the Quadron Pavin
 An Almaine
 A French Toy
 Excuse me
 Robinson Idelsbie
 Shepard shoot home
 Ioan come kisse me now
 A Psalme
 Passamezzo Galiard
 The new Hunts up
 Souches March
 Whetelies wheat-sheafe
 O Hone
 An Almaine
 An Almaine
 Robinsons modicum
 An Almaine
 Farewell deare love
 Alexander Chezum his Curranta
 Robarts Request
 The Quadro Pavin
 For two Citharens
 What if a day
 Ah, alas, thou God of Gods
 Now Cupid looke about thee
 Pauuana Passamezzo
 Mr. North his Novell
 Fantasia
 Fantasia 2
 Fantasia 3
 Fantasia 4

Others
There are some further pieces and arrangements from Thomas Robinson in other manuscripts:
Spanish Pavan (in Add. MS 3056 (Cozens Lute Book), ca. 1595, Cambridge University Library) – a version in major
Hay (in Dd. 9.33, 1600, Cambridge University Library)
Pipers Galliard Jo Dowland. Tho. Robinson (in Ms. Dd. 4.23, Cambridge University Library)
Galliard T. R. (in Ms. Dd. 4.23, Cambridge University Library)
[The Hunt's Up] T: R. (in Ms. Dd. 4.23, Cambridge University Library)

Bibliography
 Lumsden, David (pub.) Thomas Robinson: The Schoole of Musicke. Paris, Editions du Centre National de la Recherche Scientifique, 1971, 
 William Casey (pub.), Alfredo Colman (pub.), Thomas Robinson: New Citharen Lessons (1609), 1997 Baylor University Press, Waco, Texas, 
 John M Ward, Sprightly and Cheerful Musick: Notes on the Cittern, Gittern & Guitar in 16th- & 17th-Century England in: The Lute Society Journal 21 (1979–81): 69–70
 G. Doc Rossi, Cittern Music of Thomas Robinson, 2007 Cetra Publishing, Michigan, USA. Contains New Citharen Lessons plus all known pieces in manuscripts. 2 volumes – Vol. I Tablature. Vol. II Commentary and transcriptions. Available in print and as eBook.

References

External links
Works from Thomas Robinson in tablature and MIDI – Dartmouth College, Hanover, N.H.
Compositions by Thomas Robinson in tablature and MIDI format to be freely downloaded from Dartmouth College (New Hampshire, USA)
Text extract from The Schoole of Musicke about hand positioning in lute playing
Music Collection in Cambridge Digital Library which contains early copies/examples of Robinson's compositions

English classical composers
Renaissance composers
English Baroque composers
1560s births
17th-century deaths
People of the Elizabethan era
16th-century English composers
17th-century English composers
17th-century classical composers
English male classical composers
Composers for lute